Martin Cyril 'Cec' Whelan was an Australian rugby league footballer who played in the 1920s.

'Cec' Whelan was a local junior who played many years in the lower grades at St. George, although he only featured in first grade in the 1926 NSWRFL season.

Death
'Cec' Whelan died on 16 June 1960 at Newtown, New South Wales.

References

St. George Dragons players
Australian rugby league players
Rugby league props
1901 births
1960 deaths